Hovertravel is a ferry company operating from Southsea, Portsmouth to Ryde, Isle of Wight, UK. It is the only passenger hovercraft company currently operating in Britain since Hoverspeed stopped using its craft in favour of catamarans and subsequently ceased all ferry operations in 2005.

Hovertravel is now the world's oldest hovercraft operator, and this service is believed to be unique in western Europe. Hovertravel has claimed that it is the world's only commercial passenger hovercraft service. The operator's principal service operates between Southsea Common on the English mainland and Ryde Transport Interchange on the Isle of Wight : the crossing time of less than 10 minutes makes it the fastest route across The Solent from land to land. This service commenced operations in 1965, Hovertravel currently operates two 12000TD hovercraft on a single route between Ryde and Southsea. Additionally, Hovertravel has frequently operated other routes throughout the United Kingdom, typically as charter services.

History 
During the late 1950s and early 1960s, British inventor Sir Christopher Cockerell had, in cooperation with British aerospace manufacturer Saunders-Roe, developed a pioneering new form of transportation, embodied in the form of the experimental SR.N1 vehicle, which became widely known as the hovercraft. British manufacturer Saunders-Roe proceeded with work on various hovercraft designs, successfully developing multiple commercially viable vehicles in the mid-1960s. These included the SR.N4, a large cross-Channel ferry capable of seating up to 418 passengers along with 60 cars, and the SR.N5, the first commercially-active hovercraft.

Hovertravel first commenced operations during July 1965, initially leasing a pair of SR.N6 hovercraft, a stretched model of the SR.N5 capable of seating up to 38 passengers, from the British Hovercraft Corporation (BHC). An initial service between Ryde, Southsea and Stokes Bay, Gosport, was established. At its onset, it was planned to run a seasonal summer service to provide a unique experience orientated towards tourists visiting the region; despite this intention, a high level of regular travellers and commuters used the service to the extent that a year-round service became viable.

Early on, Hovertravel faced direct competition from another hovercraft operator, the British Rail-owned Seaspeed with its rival Cowes-Southampton route. Eventually, Hovertravel took over running of the route on behalf of Seaspeed; however, in 1980, the decision was taken to discontinue the Cowes-Southampton service due to rising costs and increased competition from Red Funnel's hydrofoils, instead concentrating its resources on the Ryde-Southsea service, which was viewed as being more viable.

In addition to its scheduled services, Hovertravel was also quick to enter the charter market. Its hovercraft proved to be of particular value to hydrocarbon exploration and seismographic surveys, which would see Hovertravel craft deployed to barren deserts, frozen arctic conditions, and previously unexplored areas of the world. During 1968, one such expedition by a single SR.N6 successfully traversed the perilous Orinoco river during an exploratory mission deep into the Amazon rainforest. While the SR.N6 had helped to prove the value of hovercraft, it was not without its flaws; due to its dependency on aviation-derived technologies, Hovertravel's fleet became increasingly expensive to maintain over time, while its high noise output was not an attractive feature either. 

As a result of high oil prices following the 1973 oil crisis and the 1979 energy crisis, the economics of the first generation of commercial hovercraft was badly hit, undermining operators' profitability and provoking customer requests for vehicles with greater fuel efficiency. The BHC achieved several advances throughout the 1970s, improving its skirt technology to increase durability and require less power, while propulsion changes helped to drive down operating costs and thereby improve the hovercraft's commercial viability. While early craft had been powered by gas turbine engines, which were frequently similar to the turboshaft engines used on helicopters; advances in diesel engines enabled their application to a new generation of hovercraft. Hovertravel elected to procure the newly developed British Hovercraft Corporation AP1-88, a medium-size diesel-powered hovercraft.

Prior to the delivery of Hovertravel's first AP1-88 hovercraft in 1983, extensive trials were performed of the vehicle to evaluate it. It was found to be considerably more economic to operate and to purchase, costing half the price of the older SR.N6 in both respects. The quieter and more economical AP1-88 was credited by Hovertravel as having revitalised the industry; the type soon entirely replaced the SR.N6 and form the bulk of the company's hovercraft fleet into the 21st century.

By the turn of the century, Hovertravel was reportedly transporting almost 1 million passengers per year across its fleet, while its services were sometimes running at an interval of every 15 minutes at particularly busy points of the day. In order to cope of demand, the company sought a suitable replacement for its aging AP1-88s. While a single BHT-130 hovercraft was operated for four years, it proved to be un-economical for on the relatively short Isle of Wight route, being better suited to longer routes, such as around Edinburgh. Thus, another type of hovercraft was sought to serve the Isle of Wight service.

Hovertravel's close relationship with hovercraft manufacturer Griffon Hoverwork has facilitated its preferences and requirements to shape the development of new hovercraft. During 2010s, while defining what would become the 12000TD hovercraft, Griffon Hoverwork drew on passenger-orientated analysis supplied by Hovertravel. Hovercraft would later acquire this vehicle, on which the passenger experience was enhanced over earlier vehicles in multiple ways; such enhancements included the incorporation of noise-minimisation measures, increased external visibility, and accessibility accommodations. Production of this new twin-diesel engine hovercraft, designated 12000TD commenced in 2015 with deliveries starting during the following year. The type has been hailed as Hovertravel's quietest and most economically viable hovercraft to date.

During the COVID-19 pandemic two of the company's hovercraft were modified to take stretchers and a temporary landing point was opened in Southampton to allow patients to be transferred to its hospital.

Services 

For several decades, Hovertravel had operated a hovercraft ferry route between the mainland of the United Kingdom (UK) from Southsea across the Solent to Ryde on the Isle of Wight. During low tide, the hovercraft travels over sand flat at a distance of a mile to reach Ryde's hover port. By 2008, this service was the last regular route served by hovercraft anywhere in the UK. That same year, Southsea Terminal was refurbished to extend its lifetime and improve its facilities; alterations included a new wall separating the hoverport and the esplanade, as well as new lighting, toilet blocks, and a clean up of the site.

During October 2017, both of the Griffon Hoverwork 12000TD hovercraft were temporarily taken out of service due to several technical and reliability issues, including instances of engine failure. A pair of AP1-88s were taken out of reserve to operate the service in their place. The 12000TD returned to regular service three weeks later.

Hovertravel has occasionally been chartered to operate temporary hovercraft services across the Firth of Tay between Carnoustie and St Andrews, typically in connection with major golf tournaments, demand being amplified by insufficient hotel accommodation available at Carnoustie. Additionally, between 16 July and 28 July 2007, the Solent Express was chartered to operate an experimental service across the Firth of Forth (marketed as "Forthfast") between Portobello, Edinburgh, and Kirkcaldy in conjunction with Scottish transport firm Stagecoach Group.

1972 accident 
On 4 March 1972, Hovertravel's SR-N6 012 capsized off Southsea, with a loss of five lives, including a single missing person who was presumed drowned. The craft had been en route from Ryde to Southsea with 26 people on board, including the crew; it had been about a quarter of a mile (400 metres) offshore when it was hit by an unusually large wave, causing the vehicle to capsize. All visible survivors were rescued from the sea, while the hovercraft itself was towed ashore at Southsea. The captain of the SR.N6 was praised for his prompt efforts to rescue the people on board. This incident was the world's first fatal accident involving a commercially operated hovercraft, and the first fatal accident involving a hovercraft in the United Kingdom.

Fleet

Presently, Hovertravel operates a pair of 12000TDs, produced by sister company Griffon Hoverwork, called Solent Flyer and Island Flyer. Each craft is outfitted with 78 seats, access to the passenger cabin is provided via two doorways located on the bow of the vehicle. The pilot operates the craft from a central wheelhouse.

References

Citations

Bibliography

 Hewish, Mark. "Quiet Craft Hovers Ahead of Competition."  New Scientist, 3 February 1983. Vol. 97, No. 1343. ISSN 0262-4079. pp. 297–299.
 Hollebone, Ashley. "The Hovercraft Story." The History Press, 2012. .
 Hollebone, Ashley. "The Hovercraft: A History." The History Press, 2012. .
 Paine, Robin and Roger Syms. "On a Cushion of Air."  Robin Paine, 2012. .

External links 

 
 History and current details of Hovertravel and hovercraft used
 Account and pictures of the 1972 accident

Shipping companies of the United Kingdom
Ferry transport on the Isle of Wight
Companies based in Portsmouth
Transport in Hampshire
1965 establishments in England
Bland Group